The European Commissioner for Energy is a member of the European Commission. The current Commissioner is Kadri Simson, in office since 1 December 2019.

Responsibilities
The Commissioner holds responsibility for the European Union's energy policy as well as nuclear issues (Euratom). It was previously a backwater in the commission but has now become sought-after as the European energy policy has been developed. The Commissioner for Energy has to deal with ongoing gas disputes between Russia and Ukraine which threaten European supplies, reduce dependence on Russian energy and reduce carbon emissions.

The Directorate-General serving this Commissioner is the Directorate-General for Energy, which was combined with Transport prior to 2010.

Miguel Arias Cañete (2014–2019)
A member of the centre-right People's Party, Arias served as Minister for Agriculture, Food and Environment in the Spanish Government from 2011 until 2014, before being selected to head his Party List in the European Parliamentary elections.

Arias Cañete was nominated as EU Commissioner for Energy and Climate Action in the Juncker Commission and took office on 1 November 2014.

Günther Oettinger (2010–2014)
Günther Oettinger was appointed as the new Energy Commissioner in February 2010. However he was criticised for corruption and avoidance of EU law in his home state. His language skills have also been criticised and his nomination was met with confusion in Brussels.

Andris Piebalgs (2004–2010)
During his hearing with the European Parliament, Piebalgs stressed the importance of the environment in energy policy and was cautious of nuclear power. He received strong backing from the Parliament. He outlined his priorities as;
 Achieving a true internal market
 Energy efficiency: everyone can make a difference
 Increase the share of renewable energy
 Increased investments in technology
 Safety and security of nuclear power
 Make it easier for Member States to help each other in energy crisis
 Developing external energy policy relations

The European Union is an active supporter of the Kyoto Protocol, which it signed alongside its member-states. In March 2007 the Union committed itself to cut  emissions by 20 percent by 2020. There is also a desire to reduce dependency on Russian energy supplies following the disputes between Russia and Belarus and Ukraine. In April 2007 five southern European countries signed a deal to build an oil pipeline (the Pan-European Oil Pipeline) from the Black Sea to Italy which will help diversify energy sources.

List of commissioners

See also

 European Commissioner
 Directorate-General for Energy
 Energy Community
 Energy Charter Treaty

References

External links
 Commissioner Šefčovič's term website
 Commissioner Oettinger's term website
 EU Energy website
 Andris Piebalgs interview on eGov monitor
 Interview with Andris Piebalgs on Euractiv
 Andris Piebalgs: The EU’s energy challenges

Energy
Commissioner
European Atomic Energy Community